Or ha-Maʿarav or La Lumière du Maroc was a Jewish monthly newspaper published in Judeo-Arabic by the Hadida brothers from 1922 to 1924 in Casablanca, Morocco. Its editorial line was Zionist. It was closed by the French authorities.

See also 
 L'Avenir Illustré

References 

Jews and Judaism in Casablanca
Judeo-Arabic literature
Newspapers published in Morocco